The 2013 Texas Longhorns football team (variously "Texas," "UT," the "Longhorns," or the "Horns") represented the University of Texas at Austin in the 2013 NCAA Division I FBS football season, as a member of the Big 12 Conference. The Longhorns were led by 16th-year head coach Mack Brown and played their home games at Darrell K Royal–Texas Memorial Stadium (DKR). The team was also coached by offensive coordinators Major Applewhite and Darrell Wyatt, as well as defensive coordinator Greg Robinson; Manny Diaz was defensive coordinator to begin the season but was fired following the team's second game against Brigham Young (BYU).

The season began with a win at home against New Mexico State on August 31. However, this was followed by back-to-back losses against out-of-conference opponents; as such Texas' off-conference record was 1–2. Texas later won their conference opener against Kansas State, resulting in the Longhorns' first win against the Wildcats since 2003. Texas would later go on to attain a five-game winning streak, including a win against No. 10 Oklahoma in the Red River Rivalry. The Texas Longhorns ended the season with an 8–4 overall win–loss record and a 7–2 conference record. Despite entering the season ranked No. 15, the Longhorns dropped out of the Coaches' and AP Polls.

The season ended with a 30–7 loss to Oregon in the Alamo Bowl. This was the final game that Mack Brown would coach the Longhorns, as he announced that he would resign from his position following the bowl game on December 14, 2013.

Preseason

Spring game

Recruiting

Position key

Recruits

Schedule

Due to a weather delay during Texas' game against TCU, the game, originally broadcast on Fox Sports 1, was moved to Fox Sports 2 and Fox Sports Southwest.

Depth chart
Texas depth chart as of the team's first game against New Mexico State.

Game summaries

New Mexico State

Prior to the game, sports betting oddsmakers favored Texas to win by 42 points, with an over-under of approximately 58 points. The game was sponsored by Southwest Airlines and showcased the Longhorns Alumni Band and members of the 1963 Texas Longhorns football team.

The Texas Longhorns began the game by kicking the ball off to New Mexico State. Throughout the first quarter, both teams were held scoreless by the opposing defense. The Aggies had four drives in the first quarter, with two ending on punts, one on a turnover on downs, and the final drive ending on a fumble. The Longhorns' first three drive ended on a fumble, turnover on downs, and a punt, respectively. In the second quarter, Texas quarterback David Ash threw two interceptions; on the second turnover New Mexico State was able to drive downfield to achieve the first score of the game on an 11-yard pass. After these two turnovers, however, David Ash would throw two touchdown passes in excess of 50 yards, and as such the score at the end of the first half was 14–7, with Texas leading.

In the third quarter, Texas scored on three consecutive touchdowns to begin the second half, including a 74-yard pass from David Ash to Malcolm Brown. The final two Longhorns drives in the third quarter ended in punts. New Mexico State began to third quarter with a drive ending in an interception; the four subsequent drives ended on punts. All Texas drives in the fourth quarter ended in touchdowns, while the Aggies were held scoreless. The game ended with Texas winning 56–7, exceeding the point spread and over-under set by oddsmakers prior to the game.

Despite being held scoreless until the final two minutes of the second quarter, the Longhorns' offense broke several records. The offense recorded 715 yards of total offense, breaking a 1998 school record for most offensive output in a single game. The offensive output also was the first game in which Texas recorded at least 700 yards of total offense. In addition, the 359 yards of passing and 356 yards of rushing marked only the fourth time in school history in which at least 300 yards were recorded for both passing and rushing in a single game. Four of Texas' touchdowns were scored on plays in excess of 50 yards, tying a Mack Brown record for most touchdown plays of such length in a single game. Of the 715 yards of total offense, 434 were at least partially attributable to quarterback David Ash, the most ever from a player in a season opener and sixth all-time.

BYU

Sources:

Heading into the game sports oddsmakers favored Texas to win by seven points, with an over-under of approximately 57, denoting a projected score of around 32 to 25, with Texas winning.

Ole Miss

Kansas State

Iowa State

Oklahoma

TCU

Kansas

West Virginia

Oklahoma State

Texas Tech

Baylor

Oregon

Rankings

On August 2, 2013, the USA Today Preseason Coaches' Poll was released, followed by the Associated Press College Poll on August 17. Both polls placed Texas at No. 15, making it the second consecutive year that both polls placed Texas at that ranking.

Notes

References

Texas
Texas Longhorns football seasons
Texas Longhorns football